Christopher Kevin Willis (born February 26, 1969) is an American singer, songwriter, and record producer. Although initially a gospel singer, he later received international attention for his collaborations with house music artist David Guetta, including the songs "Just a Little More Love", "Love Don't Let Me Go, "Love Is Gone", "Tomorrow Can Wait", "Everytime We Touch" (with Steve Angello and Sebastian Ingrosso), "Would I Lie to You" (with Cedric Gervais) and "Gettin' Over You".

Biography 
Originally a gospel singer, with the Heritage Singers and others, he was featured on the pop-classical album Handel's Messiah – A Soulful Celebration in 1993, singing a contemporary version of "Every Valley Shall Be Exalted". His first job after college in Alabama was touring with a group that sang hundreds of shows in churches over a two-year period. In the mid-1990s, he toured as backup vocalist for Twila Paris. In 1996, he released his debut self-titled album, for which he wrote or co-wrote eight of the eleven songs, and earned a nomination for Best R&B Album at the 1996 Nashville Music Awards. That year, he opened on tour for Mark Lowry, and was one of several featured singers in the musical showcase Emmanuel, a national tour put together by Nashville producer Norman Miller. The tour spawned an album, which won a GMA Dove Award in 1998 for Special Event Album of the Year. He did mostly gospel until 1998 when he signed with a small music label. The label was bought out by a large corporation and Willis took that as a cue to move on. During this time he also worked to resolve the "angst" from being closeted about his sexuality, "I always felt like God really understood—but that wasn't the message I was receiving in the church. So, when I moved out on my own I really internalized that message that God makes us who we are and that it's up to us to embrace that or not. I chose to embrace all those things as freedom, and that freedom begat the freedom I experience now." He cites his internalized struggle as important to his transitioning out of gospel music. "I think there's this unspoken denial that you go through in gospel—maybe so in other musical art forms too—but I just felt for me it just wasn't easy to keep perpetuating that." On June 2, 2014, Willis married Jacqueline Leiske.

In 2000 he was working with the French boy band 2Be3 and when doing some publicity for their album in Paris one of the bandmates introduced him to house musician and producer David Guetta. Guetta invited Willis to the studio and the next day they wrote 'Just a Little More Love.' Willis co-wrote and provided most of the vocals on Guetta's debut album Just a Little More Love, including the hit title track.

His music genres have included gospel music, disco, pop rock, and R&B. Willis is active on social networks including MySpace, Facebook and recently Twitter. He often adds live photos and videos from his tours and answers questions from fans. Throughout 2009 he toured with David Guetta through Europe in support of One Love. He has also been doing solo European dates. In November 2009 he performed at Danceclub C4 in Steyer, Austria for their 2nd Anniversary Party. A documentary about him, Inside Out, directed by Robert Jason and Eric Miclette for Complete World Domination was released in early 2010 alongside the "Gettin' Over" single.

His solo single "Louder (Put Your Hands Up)" was released on October 12, 2010. Willis co-wrote the song with Cutfather and Jonas Jeberg. The video premiered on DailyMotion October 26, 2010. Shot in Los Angeles, the video was directed by Billie Woodruff. The video now has nearly 2 million views on his YouTube page. The song reached number one on Billboards Hot Dance Club Songs on the issue dated January 8, 2011.

His second single "Too Much In Love" was released digitally August 16, 2011. The song features a guitar sample of Lenny Kravitz's "Are You Gonna Go My Way". A video was shot in Los Angeles and released on January 10, 2012. Many remixes have been created and released on iTunes.

An eight-song EP entitled "Premium – Songs From The Love Ship, Vol. 1" was released on November 29, 2011 and features several of his solo singles

Discography

Studio albums

Singles

As lead artist

As featured artist

References

External links
 

Living people
20th-century African-American male singers
African-American male  singer-songwriters
American male pop singers
American rhythm and blues singer-songwriters
1978 births
LGBT Christians
LGBT people from Ohio
American LGBT singers
Musicians from Dayton, Ohio
Singer-songwriters from Ohio
Bisexual men
Bisexual musicians
21st-century African-American male singers
21st-century American LGBT people